Aldo Arcángel Osorio (born 12 June 1974) is an Argentine retired professional footballer. He played as attacker in different clubs in Argentina, Italy and Spain.

References

1974 births
Living people
Sportspeople from Buenos Aires Province
Argentine footballers
Association football forwards
Argentine Primera División players
La Liga players
Serie A players
Serie B players
Club Almirante Brown footballers
Club Atlético Huracán footballers
Comisión de Actividades Infantiles footballers
All Boys footballers
Argentinos Juniors footballers
Quilmes Atlético Club footballers
Talleres de Remedios de Escalada footballers
Newell's Old Boys footballers
U.S. Lecce players
F.C. Crotone players
CD Numancia players
Argentine expatriate footballers
Expatriate footballers in Spain
Expatriate footballers in Italy